A häufebecher is a stackable beaker, usually made of silver. They were well established in Germany by the 16th century and are often highly valued by antiques collectors.

References

Antiques
Containers